Herly Enrique Alcázar Vélez (born 30 October 1976) is a Colombian footballer who plays as a striker.

Alcazar previously played for several clubs in South America and also Chiapas in the Mexican Primera Division.

Honours

Club
Once Caldas
 Copa Libertadores (1): 2004

References

1976 births
Living people
Sportspeople from Cartagena, Colombia
Colombian footballers
Colombian expatriate footballers
Colombia international footballers
Cienciano footballers
Atlético Junior footballers
Sporting Cristal footballers
Independiente Santa Fe footballers
Deportes Tolima footballers
Centauros Villavicencio footballers
Once Caldas footballers
Club Deportivo Universidad de San Martín de Porres players
Universidad de Chile footballers
Chiapas F.C. footballers
O'Higgins F.C. footballers
Atlético Huila footballers
La Equidad footballers
América de Cali footballers
Categoría Primera A players
Peruvian Primera División players
Chilean Primera División players
Liga MX players
Expatriate footballers in Peru
Expatriate footballers in Chile
Expatriate footballers in Mexico
Association football forwards